Eszter Balint (born 7 July 1966) is a Hungarian-American singer, songwriter, violinist, and actress.

Biography
Eszter Balint was born in Budapest, Hungary, to Marianne Kollar and Stephan Balint. She was living with the avant-garde Squat Theatre troupe in New York City, founded by her father when she first met Jean-Michel Basquiat. They became involved while he was filming Downtown 81.

In 1983, Balint was brought into the studio by Basquiat to play violin on the influential hip-hop record "Beat Bop" by Rammellzee and K-Rob.

Balint made her cinematic debut in 1984 in director Jim Jarmusch's independent film Stranger Than Paradise. In 1985. she made her TV debut in Miami Vice as Dorothy Bain in the episode "Buddies". She appeared in the 1990 film Bail Jumper. Roles in The Linguini Incident (1991), Woody Allen's Shadows and Fog (1991) and Steve Buscemi's Trees Lounge (1996) followed.

Balint's albums, Flicker (1998) and Mud (2004), both produced by JD Foster, were praised by The New York Times, The New Yorker, and Billboard Magazine. In his review of Mud, Jon Pareles writes: "Miss Balint has her own film noir sensibility as a songwriter. She puts arty twists into back-alley Americana... but the cleverness is not the point. She slips inside her characters to project their restlessness and longing."

Balint has appeared on recordings by Michael Gira's Angels of Light, Marc Ribot's Los Cubanos Postizos and John Lurie's Marvin Pontiac's Greatest Hits, Dayna Kurtz, and the Swans. She was a featured guest member of Marc Ribot's Ceramic Dog touring Europe throughout 2009 and is featured on their 2013 release "Your Turn."

In 2014, Balint appeared as Amia, a violin-playing Hungarian love interest for Louis C.K. on the latter's FX sitcom, Louie.

In 2015, Balint released her third album Airless Midnight, produced by JD Foster. That same year, Paste magazine premiered Balint's first official music video, "Trouble You Don't See." Josh Jackson wrote: "Paste named Eszter Balint an artist to watch back in 2004 after she released her second album Mud. And while she stepped back from music to focus on parenting soon after, she’s delivered on that promise with this year’s long-awaited follow-up Airless Midnight, which comes on the heels of a recurring role as a Louis C.K.’s love interest in the most recent season of Louie."

Balint played Fern in the 2019 film The Dead Don't Die.

References

External links

Official website
SiouxWIRE interview interview + profile
Chicago Tribune's Greg Kot article
WGN radio interview

Hungarian emigrants to the United States
American film actresses
American women singers
1966 births
Living people
Actresses from Budapest
Musicians from Budapest
21st-century American women